Robert Nazaryan (born June 26, 1956 in Yerevan) is an Armenian politician, and former mayor of Yerevan. Since 2012, Nazaryan works as the chief of the Public Services Regulatory Commission of Armenia. Robert Nazaryan was a deputy energy minister from 1997 to 2000, minister of transport and communications (2000). But now (2018) Robert Nazaryan is chief of Public Services Regulatory Commission.

He was mayor of Yerevan from 2001 to 2003.

In July 2013, President Serzh Sargsyan re-appointed him as chief of Public Services Regulatory Commission for another 5 years.

See also 
List of mayors of Yerevan

References 

Living people
1956 births
Mayors of Yerevan
Transport ministers of Armenia
Government ministers of Armenia